The Rays–Red Sox rivalry is a Major League Baseball (MLB) rivalry between the Tampa Bay Rays and Boston Red Sox clubs. Since then, both teams have won the American League (AL) East division a combined seven times in the past 13 years. While the rivalry is more recent than the storied Yankees–Red Sox rivalry, it has been called one of the most competitive in modern baseball.

History

1998–2007: First meetings
Their record that year was dismal, winning only 63 games. The Red Sox were far more successful, finishing 92–70 and taking a Wild Card berth; they took the season series against the Devil Rays 9–3. 

One bright spot for Tampa was third baseman Wade Boggs who, while batting .280/.348/.400 in 1998, turned out to be one of the most productive players on the team. Boggs' relationship with Boston was complicated; an eight-time All-Star with the Red Sox, his signing with the New York Yankees in  earned him the scorn of some Boston fans, who booed him on his return to Fenway Park. Even after leaving New York to sign with the Devil Rays, Boggs continued to be met with boos in Boston. Boggs was also at the center of a controversy when rumors emerged that he had negotiated a bonus with the Devil Rays that would require him to request depiction in the Hall of Fame wearing a Devil Rays cap (though he denied the claims); he was ultimately inducted on the 2005 ballot wearing a Red Sox cap Boggs' number 12 was retired by the Rays in 2000, and his number 26 was retired by the Red Sox in 2016. 

The teams' first confrontation came at Tropicana Field on August 29, 2000, when Devil Rays leadoff hitter Gerald Williams was hit by a pitch thrown by the Red Sox' Pedro Martínez. Williams charged the mound and landed a right hook on Martinez, leading to a benches-clearing brawl that ended with the ejection of Williams and manager Larry Rothschild (while Martínez remained in the game). Over the course of the game, six more Devil Rays were ejected (including three pitchers who threw at Red Sox batters in retaliation). For his part, Martínez would end up taking a no-hitter into the ninth inning. The brawl was not forgotten, however. When Tampa beat the Red Sox on September 29 and eliminated them from playoff contention, Devil Rays closer Roberto Hernandez sarcastically waved goodbye to the struck-out Trot Nixon and the rest of the Red Sox team while the Rays celebrated on the mound.

Early into the next season, an incident occurred where Nixon threw his bat at Rays pitcher Ryan Rupe, who had hit the Sox' Nomar Garciaparra and Shea Hillenbrand earlier in the inning. Red Sox pitcher Frank Castillo would go on to hit Devil Rays batter Randy Winn, after which the plate umpire issued warnings to both dugouts. Nixon and Castillo were suspended four and five games, respectively, while Rupe got away with a fine.

Brawls between the clubs would continue throughout the 2000s, even as the Devil Rays struggled while the Red Sox made four postseason appearances through  (including two World Series titles, in 2004 and 2007). In , the Red Sox hit Aubrey Huff, and the Devil Rays retaliated by throwing at Manny Ramirez and David Ortiz, causing a melee in which six players and both managers were ejected. The next day, Boston pitcher Curt Schilling made comments on a radio show criticizing Tampa manager Lou Piniella: "When you're playing a team with a manager who somehow forgot how the game is played, there's problems [...] Lou's trying to make his team be a bunch of tough guys, and the telling sign is when the players on that team are saying, 'This is why we lose a hundred games a year, because this idiot makes us do stuff like this.'" Piniella responded by saying, "If we're going to get thrown at, we're not going to tolerate that, either." In , Red Sox pitcher Julián Tavárez, covering home plate, stepped on the arm of Devil Rays baserunner Joey Gathright and then punched him, inciting another brawl and earning him a ten game suspension.

2008–present: The rivalry intensifies
The Devil Rays rebranded themselves as the Rays before the  season. That same year, their on-field fortunes would dramatically improve, bringing them into further conflict with the World Series-champion Red Sox. The anger between the teams was crystallized by a series of incidents in a June series, after Boston center fielder Coco Crisp slid hard into Tampa second baseman Akinori Iwamura; the next night, Rays pitcher James Shields drilled Crisp, inciting a benches-clearing brawl. In September, the Rays would win their first series at Fenway—something Peter Gammons called "a turning point in franchise history"—finishing the year with a 97–65 record and, displacing the heavily favored Red Sox, their first AL East title. Boston, having secured a wild card berth, met Tampa in the 2008 American League Championship Series. The Rays gained a 3–1 series lead, including a walk-off sacrifice fly by B.J. Upton in Game 2, but Boston came back (winning Game 5 after being down 7-0) to send the series to a seventh game. However the Rays won Game 7 3-1 in St. Petersburg, eliminating Boston and sending Tampa to its first World Series (which it would lose to the Philadelphia Phillies).

Though both teams failed to make deep postseason runs the following year (which saw the shared division rival New York Yankees win the World Series), the rivalry remained alive. In , Boston and Tampa were tied in a Wild Card race that came down to the last day of the season. Red Sox outfielder Carl Crawford (a former Rays All-Star) missed a fly ball to lose their game against Baltimore Orioles; Rays star Evan Longoria would go on to hit a walk-off home run against the Yankees to secure the Wild Card berth, and eliminate the Red Sox from playoff contention. Crawford was traded to Los Angeles the next year, after which he would call the environment in Boston "toxic." 

In , though, Boston saw a resurgence headlined by Ortiz and Dustin Pedroia (as well as former Ray Jonny Gomes). This year also saw several altercations. On June 10, Rays batter Matt Joyce exchanged choice words with Red Sox pitcher John Lackey after being thrown out at first, and benches cleared after Lackey hit Joyce in his next at-bat. On July 29, after a controversial Rays victory where umpire Jerry Meals incorrectly ruled a tying run out at home plate, the teams traded barbs on social media, with the Red Sox Twitter account saying it looked forward to playing "home games" at Tropicana Field in September (in reference to the Rays' notorious attendance issues). The teams met in the 2013 ALDS, which Boston won 3-1; the Red Sox would go on to win the 2013 World Series against St. Louis.

Confrontations continued into the 2010s, even as the Rays declined and ceded ground in the AL East to Toronto and Baltimore. Brawls erupted in two games of the  season, on May 25 and May 30, leading to several ejections.
On July 27 of the same year, Rays pitcher Chris Archer took exception to a home run celebration by David Ortiz at Tropicana Field, saying the Red sox slugger acted like he was "bigger than the game of baseball" 
and that Ortiz felt "like the show is all about him." Ortiz dismissed Archer's comments, saying the young rookie was "not the right guy to be saying that" since he had "only two days in the league." In the wake of the episode, manager Joe Maddon acknowledged the friction between the teams, saying "What did Don Drysdale say to the last guy he knocked down on his butt back in 1963? Nothing. He didn't say anything [...] Those kind of thoughts are kind of insinuated, put in play. Play the game."

This was because the Red Sox had 108 wins for the division title, while the Wild Card spots went to the Yankees (with 100 wins) and the Athletics (with 97).

The next season, the situation was reversed. Tampa secured a Wild Card berth while Boston, the reigning WS champion, was shut out of the postseason. The Red Sox also failed to make the postseason in the shortened  season, while the Rays won the division and the American League Pennant (though they lost to the Dodgers, headlined by former Red Sox outfielder Mookie Betts, in the World Series).

Several controversies erupted during the series. including after rumors emerged that the Rays, having won the first game at home 5–0, had ordered champagne for an expected series victory at Fenway Park. The Red Sox's Alex Verdugo said the move was disrespectful. 

  

Another controversy emerged in Game 3, when a batted ball from Ray Kevin Kiermaier was misplayed by Boston outfielder Hunter Renfroe (who formerly played for the Rays) and knocked into the bullpen, out of play. The play, which otherwise would have resulted in a go-ahead run for Tampa in extra innings, was ruled a ground rule double; Boston walked it off in the bottom of the inning. Boston also won Game 4 with a walkoff sacrifice fly to move on to the ALCS. The last two games of the series were Boston's first set of back-to-back walk-off wins in the postseason since the 2004 ALCS against the Yankees.

See also
Major League Baseball rivalries
Bruins-Lightning rivalry

References

Tampa Bay Rays
Boston Red Sox
Major League Baseball rivalries